Cassino, sometimes spelt Casino, is a fishing card game for two to four players (best for two) using a standard, 52-card, French-suited pack. It is the only fishing game to have penetrated the English-speaking world. It is very similar to the later Italian game of Scopa and is often said, without substantiation, to be of Italian origin.

History 
Although Cassino is often claimed to be of Italian origin, detailed research by Franco Pratesi has shown that there is no evidence of it ever being played in Italy and the earliest references to its Italian cousins, Scopa and Scopone, post-date those of Cassino. The spelling "Cassino" is used in the earliest rules of 1790 and is the most persistent spelling since, although German sources invariably use the spelling "Casino" along with some later English sources.

Likewise an origin in gambling dens appears unlikely since a casino in the late 18th century was a summer house or country villa; the name was not transferred to gambling establishments until later.

In fact, as "Cassino", the game is first recorded in 1790 in England where it appears to have become something of a fashionable craze, and certainly well known enough for Mrs. Scatter to declare "I do long for a game of Cassino" in Frederic Reynolds' 1797 comedy, Cheap Living. At that stage, the court cards had no numerical value and could only be paired, and there was no building; that did not appear in English rules until the second half of the century. The counting cards were the Aces and two special cards known as the 'Great Cassino' (10) and 'Little Cassino' (2). As the game developed, further counters were added.

One country to follow hard on English heels was Austria-Hungary where, as early as 1795 in Vienna and Prague, rules were published that incorporated English terminology such as "sweep" and "lurch." Initially the rules followed those in English sources, but as early as 1810, a markedly different variant appeared in which the court cards, Aces and Cassinos became far more potent. The courts were given values of 11, 12 and 13 respectively, the Aces could be valued at 14 as well as 1, the Great Cassino at 10 or 16 and the Little Cassino at 2 or 15. This elaboration of the Cassino went unnoticed in its country of origin and across the Atlantic, apart from a fleeting observation in 1846 by Lady Sarah Nicolas in 1846 who recounts that "the game of Cassino is thus played in some parts of Germany:- Great Cassino takes sixteen. Little Cassino – fifteen. Every Ace – fourteen. King – thirteen. Queen – twelve. Knave – eleven."

Rules continued to be published in German until at least 1975, but the game seems to have waned in Germany and Austria towards the end of the 19th century.

However, while the game began to fade away in England, it was in America that Cassino gained its second wind in the second half of the 19th century, largely due to several interesting new variants that emerged, including what became Royal Cassino, in which court cards were given a numerical value as in German Cassino such that they could capture two or more cards, and Spade Cassino, in which players scored for the most Spades, and Diamond Cassino, in which three cards are dealt instead of four. Royal Cassino is mentioned as early as 1894 when we learn that a passenger on a line from New York to London played the game with a doctor and his wife but its rules first appear in English Foster's Complete Hoyle of 1897. Cassino was eventually eclipsed by Gin Rummy. 

By the early 20th century, Cassino itself was obsolete everywhere, but two successors were emerging. Zwickern,  a north German variant, introduced up to 6 Jokers as special cards and grew so popular that bespoke packs were made for it. Today the game is still played in a few villages in Schleswig. Tablanette, another apparent variant in which the Kings, Queens, Knaves and Tens are also counters, appeared in the late 19th in a German source and later featured in one of Hubert Phillips' games compendia in 1939. It does not seem to have caught on, although it may have gained more traction in its various eastern European forms.

The deal
The dealer deals four cards to each player and four cards face up in the middle. Traditionally, the deal is in twos: two cards at a time to each player. The remainder of the deck is temporarily put aside. After everyone has played their four cards, another hand of four cards is dealt to each player from the remaining cards (two at a time), but no more cards are dealt to the table after the first deal. After these cards have been played there is another deal, and this continues until all 52 cards have been dealt. The dealer announces "cards" when dealing the last cards. After the last cards have been played, and the hand scored, the deal passes to the left for the next round.

The play
Beginning with the player to the dealer's left, each player plays one card at a time, performing one (or more) of the following actions:

 Trailing: Any card may be discarded face up to the table.
 Pairing: Any card may be used to take one or more cards of the same number, or a build with the same value, that is face up on the table.
 Combining: A number card may be used to take two or more cards whose pips total the number on the card being used to take them. For example, a player may take a 3 and a 6 with a 9, or may take a 2, 4, and 4 with a 10.  
 Building: Cards may be built upon in one of two ways (see Building).

Players may perform two of the above actions only when pairing and combining simultaneously; e.g. Agatha may take a 3, a 4 and a 7 with her own seven.

Players with builds on the table are limited in the actions they are permitted to make. This is described in more detail below.

Face cards do not have a denomination in Cassino and are not available for building. The face-cards may only be paired one at a time; if there are two queens on the table, only one queen can be paired up. This removes the possibility of a so-called "orphan" face card remaining and preventing further sweeps.

An ace has a numerical value of 1.

Cards are usually left on the table after each player's final hand is exhausted. These cards are given to the last player to take in cards through pairing or combining. It is common for the dealer, if dealt a face-card in the final hand, to hold this until the final play, as they are certain to pair with it.

Building
Under the first type of building, a player may lay one card on top of another if their total equals the total of a card in their hand, and announce that the two cards are built to the total. For example, a player may build a 2 onto a 7 and announce "building nine," provided they have a 9 in their hand. The two cards cannot be split up for pairing or combining and are treated as a single nine.

Builds of this type may be taken in by any player by pairing. The building player's adversaries may also take in a build by combination, increasing the capturing number; that is, an eight build may be combined with an ace if an adversary holds a nine. Any player may also continue to build on a build, for example, a seven build could be built to nine by a player with a 2 and a 9. The player who originally builds may also re-build, but only if they hold all appropriate cards: they would have to hold both a 7 and a 9 to make the required building steps.

Under the second type of building, called "multiple building," "natural building", or "double building," a player may lay one card on top of another if their values are the same, and announce that the two cards are built together. That is, a player can place a 7 on top of another 7, or on top of a 5 and a 2 which have been built to 7, and announce "building sevens," provided that a 7 is held. The built cards are gathered only with another 7. As with the first build type, a player must hold the card necessary to gather the build for the natural build to be permissible. Importantly, the capturing number of a multiple build can never be changed.

An optional rule is that, when building in this manner, players may combine other cards on the table, and build in the first manner. For example, suppose the cards on the table are 2 K 6 5 8, and the player holds a 3 and an 8. They may play their 3 onto the 5 to "build eight" and in the same move "build eights" by gathering the 5-3, the 8, and the 6-2 together onto one pile, taking in all five cards on their next play.

Advantages gained through building
Building exists as a means of protecting cards from being captured by adversaries. The first form of building is a weaker form of protection, and primarily protects cards against combination by mid-to-high range cards. Natural building is a much stronger protection, and prevents adversaries from taking cards unless they hold a card of specific face value, one of which the builder already knows resides in their own hand.

The value of building decreases significantly as the number of players in the game increases. In a two-player game, one requires only one adversary to be bereft of the necessary cards; in a four-player game, one requires three adversaries to be lacking the necessary cards to steal a build. As such, building effectively in a two-player game can be very advantageous, but in a four-player game is very difficult.

Acting with builds on the table
At least three rule variants exist dictating the actions which may be taken by a player who has a build on the table:
Variant 1: a player with a build on the table is not permitted to trail a card until that build has been taken in or rebuilt upon by an adversary; they may, however, pair or continue their "build" with any card on the table.
Variant 2: a player with a build on the table is obliged to either take in that build, by pairing or combination, or to add to that build on their next turn.
Variant 3: A player with a build on the table cannot trail.  Play must initiate from the hand.  Continuing a build from only cards on the table is not allowed.  You must either take in the build, duplicate it or increase it, OR defer by starting another build or assuming ownership of an opponent's build.  A build 'belongs' to the last player that set its value.  You may assume ownership of a build started by another by increasing it.  But only if it consists of a single combination, i.e., not duplicated.  You may have more than one build, but only one of any particular value, and having a build of the same value of another (an adversary's) makes no sense at all.
While Hoyle recommends variant 1, all variants are very common in different regions. The regional variant of this rule in particular should always be checked before play.

Which variant is used changes the tactics, particularly in a two-player game. Under variant 1, the builder has a profound advantage; if they know that their adversary lacks the cards necessary to steal their build, they can often take several cards trailed by their adversary before taking in their build at the end of the round. Variant 2 allows the adversary to trail a card they wish to subsequently capture without the risk of it being taken, reducing the builder's advantage.

Scoring
The round is over when the stock has been exhausted, and the last deal played. Players count their tricks and score points as follows:

 Higher number of cards: 3
 Higher number of spades: 1
 10 ("big cassino", "big ten", or "good ten"): 2
 2 ("little cassino", "little deuce", "good two", or "spy two"): 1
 Each ace: 1
 Each clearing of the board known as a "Sweep" : 1 extra point

If "most cards" or "most spades" are held by two or more players, no points are awarded in that category.

Thus there are 11 points to be won in each round if there are no sweeps scored and there is not a tie for number of cards. Typically, when at least one player has reached a score of 21 or more at the end of a round, the winner is the player to score the highest after tallying points.

In one two-player variation, a player can call for a game to be concluded once they are convinced they hold sufficient cards to bring their score to 21; if they do have 21 points, they win regardless of their opponent's score, otherwise the opponent wins.

All 11 Points
If one player has won the entire 11 points, some rules state that this player will be awarded an extra point for 12 total points in the round. Other rules state that this is a "skunk" if it occurs in the first round, and therefore that player wins. In other variations, taking all traditional 11 points in a single round is an automatic win, no matter when it occurs.

Three players in the game can share 11 points and one must lose with fewer points out of 11 points; this is a perfect balancing.

Rules variants

Sweeps
A sweep is declared by a player who manages to capture all face-up cards from the table. In some localities, each sweep is worth an additional point. The opponent has no move except to trail, and a follow-on sweep may result. Points for sweeps are awarded after the base 11 points, in the event that two players reach 21 in the same round. In another variation, trailing the five of spades sweeps the table, the sweep giving one point.

Sudden-death scoring
There is a variation in which sweeps are scored as they occur; if the sweeper had 20 points (or more, due to a tie score), the sweep would end the round instantly.  A scoring variation in which each point card is scored as it is captured also exists.

In a variation devised in Michigan, a player who defaults on the duty to capture after building gives up 2 points at the time of the violation.  This is sometimes an acceptable cost to trap cards from the other player in builds the player cannot take.  Sweeps also score 2 points.  In a series of "rounds to 5," any three instant scores (sweeps or defaults) against the same player ends the round.

These sudden-death variations make short-term tactics more important in certain situations than the longer-term goal of achieving the high score for the round.

Face cards
In some regions, all four face-cards of the same rank may be gathered simultaneously. This allows natural building with face-cards, while still removing the possibility of an "orphan" card. However, this provides no particular advantage if all four face cards are shared between one player and the table, as is necessary to build in such a manner.

Initial Pairs
Any pairs dealt to the table at the start of the round may be automatically granted to the first player to move, regardless of whether or not that player has a card to capture them. These cards cannot be built upon, but multiple pairs may constitute an automatic sweep if the table is cleared this way. This rule variation is intended to counteract the advantage of later players' ability to poach or modify builds started by the first player, by awarding extra points at the start.

Variants

Five players
Five-player Cassino can be played by removing the deuces of hearts, diamonds and clubs, and by giving an extra card to each player on the last deal.

Royal Cassino
In Royal Cassino, face cards are given number values upon which building may occur: jacks count as 11, queens as 12, kings as 13. For example, a player could combine a jack and a two with a king, since 11+2=13, and all applicable building laws remain.  An Ace is 1 or 14, the player's choice.  If trailed, it is not yet determined. If not, it is fixed. There are no 'Face Cards'.  Sweeps do not count. The total points is always 11. You may play to 6 or 21. Ties are possible if no one has the majority of spades, broken by another hand played for 6.

Trailing-royals Cassino
In the Trailing-royals Cassino variant, orphaned face cards are not considered a problem. Face cards may be naturally built or paired in any way, so a player may gather three of the same face card simultaneously.  The remaining face card will be an orphan, because there is no card left with which to capture it.  Such cards remain on the table until the end of the round, and are taken by whoever performed the final capture, as are all other cards left on the table. This method of play does not pair well with the preceding variant that rewards sweeps, because having orphaned cards on the table prevents sweeps.

Portuguese Cassino
The gameplay of Portuguese Cassino is the same as the Italian version, except for the following differences:

 The game is either 2 player or 4 players split in 2 teams
 The first player/ team to reach 31 points or more is declared the winner.
Scoring: points allocation are as follows:
 Highest number of cards: 3
 Highest number of spades: 1
 10 of diamonds ("menina"): 2
 2 of spades: 1
 Each ace: 1
 Each sweep (clareza) : 1 extra point

If both players/teams finish the round with 26 cards each, the player/team with the most spades is awarded the points for most cards.

Diamond Cassino
Diamond Cassino is a variant of Cassino which is similar to standard Cassino, but it is not played with the picture cards. It is, therefore, played with a forty-card pack. Players are dealt three cards each, and four cards are dealt to the table; these are the cards which the players aim to capture. In this game, players get points if they capture all aces, and extra points if they capture the seven of diamonds. Diamond Cassino has been described as an Italo-American version of Scopone.

Spade Cassino
In Spade Cassino, players are awarded two points for gathering the jack of spades, and one point for each additional spade, in addition to the one point awarded to the player with the most spades. This lifts the number of points awarded in one round to 25. A game of Spade Cassino is usually played to 61.

Draw Cassino
In Draw Cassino, players draw a replacement card each time they make a play, so that they always have four cards in hand (until the end), rather than being dealt cards in discrete rounds of four.

Related games
There are a number of other European fishing games in the same family as Cassino.

Callabra
In this "fast and simple forerunner of Cassino", each player is dealt three cards, and five are dealt to the table. Players may trail or take cards from the table, if they have cards which match the cards on the table, or if they have two cards which add up to a card on the table and equal the table card's value. In this game, Jacks are worth eleven points, Queens are worth twelve points and Kings are worth thirteen points. Game ends when a player finally clears all the cards from the table.

Tablanette

Tablanette is said to be of Russian provenance. In this game, each player has six cards, and a player with a jack may use it to clear the whole table. At the end of a round, players score points for holding the most cards, and extra points if they are holding picture
cards.

Diloti
In this Greek fishing game, players are dealt 6 cards. Matching face cards must be captured, so that no two face cards of the same value can ever be together in the pool. The scoring differs most notably in that there is no special suit, and sweeps are very valuable:

 Higher number of cards: 4
 10 of diamonds: 2
 2 of spades: 1
 Each ace: 1
 Each sweep (Xeri): 10 (!) extra points

See also 
 Pasur
 Mulle
 Zwickern

Notes

References

Literature 
 _ (1793). "Short Rules for Playing the Game of Cassino" in The Conjuror's Magazine, Locke, London. January issue.
 _ (1795). Der beliebte Weltmensch. Joseph Gerold, Vienna.
 Grupp, Claus D. (1975/79). Kartenspiele. Falken, Niedernhausen. .
 Long, Robert (1790). Short Rules for Playing the Game of Cassino. London: J Owens.
 Nicolas, Lady Sarah (1846). The Cairn: A Gathering of Precious Stones from Many Hands. London: George Bell.
 Pratesi, Franco (1995). "Casino From Nowhere to Vaguely Everywhere" in The Playing-Card, Vol. XXIV, No. 1, Jul/Aug 1995, ISSN 0305-2133.
 Reynolds, Frederick (1797). Cheap Living, A Comedy in Five Acts as it is performed at The Theatre-Royal, Drury Lane. London: G.G. & J. Robinson.
 von Abenstein, G.W. (1810). Spielalmanach für Karten-, Schach-, Bret-, Billard-, Kegel – und Ball-Spieler zum Selbstunterrichte von Julius Cäsar. Improved and expanded edn. Berlin: Gottfr. Hayn.

18th-century card games
English card games
Fishing card games
Two-player card games